Kishoge railway station is a railway station in Ireland that is planned to serve the Kishoge (sometimes Kishogue) housing development in west County Dublin. It is located on the South Western Commuter route from Dublin Heuston as part of the Kildare Route Project. Construction of the station is largely complete, but it had not yet opened as of early 2023.

Development
The station was initially built in 2009 for €6 million. It was the last of a series of new and upgraded stations to be built on the route to improve commuter services from the south-west of Dublin.

The station remained unopened as of 2022, with the railway network operator Iarnród Éireann stating that expected local development did not occur for economic reasons, and "there was a further delay due to the [COVID-19] pandemic".

It was reported in mid-2022 that the station would need refurbishment at a cost of €3.8 million before an anticipated station opening in late 2023, fourteen years after its original completion. By early 2023 it was reported that this refurbishment could take place between March and November 2023, with the station proposed to open in December 2023.

References

Iarnród Éireann stations in South Dublin (county)
Railway stations scheduled to open in 2023
Proposed railway stations in the Republic of Ireland